The 1941 Cincinnati Reds season was a season in American baseball. The team finished third in the National League with a record of 88–66, 12 games behind the Brooklyn Dodgers.

Offseason 
 December 12, 1940: Milt Shoffner was traded by the Reds to the New York Giants for Wayne Ambler.
 Prior to 1941 season: Grant Dunlap was signed as an amateur free agent by the Reds.

Regular season

Season standings

Record vs. opponents

Notable transactions 
 June 21, 1941: Jimmy Ripple was purchased from the Reds by the St. Louis Cardinals.

Roster

Player stats

Batting

Starters by position 
Note: Pos = Position; G = Games played; AB = At bats; H = Hits; Avg. = Batting average; HR = Home runs; RBI = Runs batted in

Other batters 
Note: G = Games played; AB = At bats; H = Hits; Avg. = Batting average; HR = Home runs; RBI = Runs batted in

Pitching

Starting pitchers 
Note: G = Games pitched; IP = Innings pitched; W = Wins; L = Losses; ERA = Earned run average; SO = Strikeouts

Other pitchers 
Note: G = Games pitched; IP = Innings pitched; W = Wins; L = Losses; ERA = Earned run average; SO = Strikeouts

Relief pitchers 
Note: G = Games pitched; W = Wins; L = Losses; SV = Saves; ERA = Earned run average; SO = Strikeouts

Farm system 

LEAGUE CHAMPIONS: Columbia, Tucson, OgdenRiverside franchise folded, June 29, 1941

References

External links
1941 Cincinnati Reds season at Baseball Reference

Cincinnati Reds seasons
Cincinnati Reds season
Cincinnati Reds